aka Torasan, From Shibamata with Love is a 1985 Japanese comedy film directed by Yoji Yamada. It stars Kiyoshi Atsumi as Torajirō Kuruma (Tora-san), and Komaki Kurihara as his love interest or "Madonna". Tora-san's Island Encounter is the thirty-sixth entry in the popular, long-running Otoko wa Tsurai yo series.

Synopsis
Tora-san's family's neighbor, Akemi, who had been married in Marriage Counselor Tora-san (1984), runs away from her husband, who is only interested in work. Tora-san follows her to Shikinejima, and attempts to bring her back to her home. In doing so he encounters a school-reunion group who are traveling to meet their elementary school teacher, which is a reference to the film Twenty-Four Eyes by Keisuke Kinoshita.  Tora-san joins them and falls in love with the teacher.

Cast
 Kiyoshi Atsumi as Torajirō
 Chieko Baisho as Sakura
 Komaki Kurihara as Machiko
 Jun Miho as Akemi
 Shimojo Masami as Kuruma Tatsuzō
 Chieko Misaki as Tsune Kuruma (Torajiro's aunt)
 Gin Maeda as Hiroshi Suwa
 Hidetaka Yoshioka as Mitsuo Suwa
 Hisao Dazai as Boss (Umetarō Katsura)
 Gajirō Satō as Genkō

Critical appraisal
Nominations for Tora-san's Island Encounter at the Japan Academy Prize included Best Actor (Kiyoshi Atsumi), Best Director (Yoji Yamada), Best Music Score (Naozumi Yamamoto), Best Sound (Isao Suzuki and Takashi Matsumoto), Best Supporting Actress (Jun Miho), and Best Art Direction (Mitsuo Degawa). Stuart Galbraith IV judges the film an entertaining, but not outstanding entry in the Otoko wa Tsurai yo series, especially if one understands the references to Kinoshita's Twenty-Four Eyes. Kevin Thomas of the Los Angeles Times called it "one of the best" stating in his 1986 review that "Yamada achieves inTora's Island Adventure evocative moments the equal of those all-too-rare features he gets to make outside his 17-year-old series." The German-language site molodezhnaja gives Tora-san's Island Encounter four out of five stars, naming it one of the highlights of the series.

Availability
Tora-san's Island Encounter was released theatrically on December 28, 1985. In Japan, the film was released on videotape in 1987 and 1996, and in DVD format in 1998, 2005 and 2008.

References

Bibliography

English

German

Japanese

External links
 Tora-san's Island Encounter at www.tora-san.jp (official site)

1985 films
1985 comedy films
Films directed by Yoji Yamada
1980s Japanese-language films
Otoko wa Tsurai yo films
Shochiku films
Films with screenplays by Yôji Yamada
Japanese sequel films
1980s Japanese films